Lindsay Davenport was the defending champion and successfully defended her title, by defeating Amélie Mauresmo 6–2, 6–4 in a rematch of the previous year's final.

Seeds
The first four seeds received a bye into the second round.

Draw

Finals

Top half

Bottom half

References

External links
 Official results archive (ITF)
 Official results archive (WTA)

2006 Singles
Porsche Tennis Grand Prix - Singles
2005 in German tennis